Class S: Agriculture is a classification used by the Library of Congress Classification system. This page outlines the subclasses of Class S.

S - Agriculture (general) 

21-400.5....................................Documents and other collections
403............................................Agricultural missions, voyages, etc.
419-482.....................................History
530-559.....................................Agricultural education
539.5-542.3.....................................Research. Experimentation
544-545.53.......................................Agricultural extension work
548-548.6........................................Historic farms
550-559...........................................Exhibitions. Fairs
560-571.5..................................Farm economics. Farm management. Agricultural mathematics. Including production standards, record keeping, farmwork rates, marketing
583-587.73.................................Agricultural chemistry. Agricultural chemicals
588.4-589.6...............................Agricultural physics. Including radioisotopes in agriculture
589.7.........................................Agricultural ecology (General)
589.75-589.76............................Agriculture and the environment
589.8-589.87..............................Plant growing media. Potting soils
590-599.9..................................Soils. Soil science. Including soil surveys, soil chemistry, soil structure, soil-plant relationships
600-600.7..................................Agricultural meteorology. Crops and climate
602.5-604.37..............................Methods and systems of culture. Cropping systems. Including fallowing, rotation of crops, plowing
604.5-604.64..............................Agricultural conservation
604.8-621.5...............................Melioration: Improvement, reclamation, fertilization, irrigation, etc., of lands
605.5...............................................Organic farming. Organiculture
606-621.5........................................Special classes of lands and reclamation methods. Including woodlands, burning of lands, deserts, saline environments, moors
622-627.....................................Soil conservation and protection
631-667.....................................Fertilizers and improvement of the soil
671-760.5..................................Farm machinery and farm engineering
770-790.3..................................Agricultural structures. Farm buildings
900-(972)...................................Conservation of natural resources. Including land conservation

SB - Plant culture 

39............................................Horticultural voyages, etc.
71-87.......................................History
107-109...................................Economic botany 
109.7-111................................Methods for special areas. Including cold regions, dry farming, tropical agriculture
112..........................................Irrigation farming
113.2-118.46............................Seeds. Seed technology
118.48-118.75..........................Nurseries. Nursery industry
119-124...................................Propagation. Including breeding, selection, grafting, air layering
125..........................................Training and pruning
126..........................................Artificial light gardening
126.5-126.57............................Hydroponics. Soilless agriculture
127..........................................Forcing
128..........................................Growth regulators
129-130...................................Harvesting, curing, storage
169-172.5................................Tree crops
175-177...................................Food crops
183-317...................................Field crops. Including cereals, forage crops, grasses, legumes, root crops, sugar plants, textile plants, alkaloidal plants, medicinal plants
317.5-319.864..........................Horticulture. Horticultural crops
320-353.5................................Vegetables
354-402...................................Fruit and fruit culture
381-386.........................................Berries and small fruits
387-399.........................................Grape culture. Viticulture
401................................................Nuts
403-450.87...............................Flowers and flower culture. Ornamental plants
406.7-406.83..................................Plant propagation
409-413.........................................Culture of individual plants
414................................................Forcing
414.6-417......................................Greenhouses and greenhouse culture
418-418.4......................................Container gardening
419-419.3......................................Indoor gardening and houseplants
419.5.............................................Roof gardening. Balcony gardening
421-439.8......................................Classes of plants. Including annuals, climbers, ferns, lawns, perennials, shrubs
441-441.75.....................................Flower shows. Exhibitions
442.5.............................................Care and preparation of cut flowers and ornamental plants for market
442.8-443.4...................................Marketing. Cut flower industry. Florists
446-446.6......................................Horticultural service industry
447................................................Preservation and reproduction of flowers, fruits, etc.
447.5.............................................Bonkei. Tray landscapes
449-450.87.....................................Flower arrangement and decoration
450.9-467.8.............................Gardens and gardening
469-(476.4)..............................Landscape gardening. Landscape architecture
481-486...................................Parks and public reservations. Including theory, management, history
599-990.5................................Pests and diseases
608................................................Individual or types of plants or trees
610-615.........................................Weeds, parasitic plants, etc.
617-618.........................................Poisonous plants
621-795.........................................Plant pathology
818-945.........................................Economic entomology
950-990.5......................................Pest control and treatment of diseases. Plant protection
950.9-970.4.........................................Pesticides
973-973.5............................................Soil disinfection
974-978...............................................Organic plant protection. Biological control
979.5-985............................................Inspection. Quarantine
992-998...................................Economic zoology applied to crops. Agricultural zoology. Including animals injurious and beneficial to plants

SD - Forestry 

11-115.....................................Documents
119..........................................Voyages, etc.
131-247.5................................History of forestry. Forest conditions
250-363.3................................Forestry education
388..........................................Forestry machinery and engineering
388.5.......................................Tools and implements
389..........................................Forest roads
390-390.43...............................Forest soils
390.5-390.7.............................Forest meteorology. Forest microclimatology
391-410.9................................Sylviculture
411-428...................................Conservation and protection. Including forest influences, damage by elements, fires, forest reserves
430-(559).................................Exploitation and utilization. Including timber trees, fuelwood, logging, transportation, valuation
561-669.5................................Administration. Policy

SF - Animal culture 

41-55.......................................History
84-84.64..................................Economic zoology
84.82-85.6...............................Rangelands. Range management. Grazing
87............................................Acclimatization 
89............................................Transportation
91............................................Housing and environmental control
92............................................Equipment and supplies
94.5-99....................................Feeds and feeding. Animal nutrition
101-103.5.................................Brands and branding, and other means of identifying
105-109....................................Breeding and breeds
111-113....................................Cost, yield, and profit. Accounting
114-121....................................Exhibitions
170-180....................................Working animals
191-275....................................Cattle
221-250..........................................Dairying
250.5-275.......................................Dairy processing. Dairy products
277-360.4.................................Horses
294.2-297.......................................Horse sports. Horse shows
304.5-307.......................................Driving
308.5-310.5....................................Horsemanship. Riding
311-312..........................................Draft horses
315-315.5.......................................Ponies
321-359.7.......................................Racing
360-360.4.......................................Feral horses. Wild horses
361-361.73...............................Donkeys
362..........................................Mules
371-379....................................Sheep. Wool
380-388....................................Goats
391-397.83...............................Swine
402-405....................................Fur-bearing animals
405.5-407.................................Laboratory animals
408-408.6.................................Zoo animals
409..........................................Small animal culture
411-459....................................Pets
421-440.2.......................................Dogs. Dog racing
441-450..........................................Cats
451-455..........................................Rabbits and hares
456-458.83.....................................Fishes. Aquariums
459................................................Other animals
461-473....................................Birds. Cage birds
481-507....................................Poultry. Eggs
508-(510.6)..............................Game birds
511-511.5.................................Ostrich
512-513....................................Ornamental birds
515-515.5.................................Reptiles
518..........................................Insect rearing
521-539.8.................................Bee culture
541-560....................................Sericulture. Silk culture
561..........................................Lac-insects
600-1100..................................Veterinary medicine
756.5-769.5....................................Special preclinical sciences. Including veterinary genetics, ethology, anatomy, physiology, embryology, pathology
780.2-780.7....................................Veterinary microbiology, bacteriology, virology, mycology
780.9.............................................Veterinary epidemiology. Epizootiology
781-809..........................................Communicable diseases of animals (General)
810................................................Veterinary parasitology
810.5-810.7....................................Predatory animals and their control
811-909..........................................Veterinary medicine of special organs, regions, and systems
910................................................Other diseases and conditions
910.5.............................................Veterinary orthopedics
911-914.4.......................................Veterinary surgery
914.3-914.4..........................................Veterinary traumatology. Veterinary emergencies
914.5.............................................Veterinary acupuncture
915-919.5.......................................Veterinary pharmacology
925................................................Veterinary physical medicine
951-997.5.......................................Diseases of special classes of animals

SH - Aquaculture. Fishery. Angling 

20.3-191..................................Aquaculture
33-134.6........................................By region or country
138................................................Mariculture
151-179.........................................Fish culture
171-179...............................................Diseases and adverse factors
185-191.........................................Frogs, leeches, etc.
201-399...................................Fisheries
213-216.55....................................By oceans and seas
219-321.........................................By region or country
327.5-327.7...................................Fishery resources. Fishery conservation
328-329.........................................Fishery management. Fishery policy
334................................................Economic aspects. Finance
334.5-334.7...................................Fishery technology
334.9-336.5...................................Fishery processing
337................................................Packing, transportation, and storage
337.5.............................................Fishing port facilities
343.2-343.3...................................Fishery oceanography. Fishery meteorology
343.4.............................................Fishery research vessels
343.5.............................................Exploratory fishing
343.8.............................................Navigation
343.9.............................................Safety measures
344-344.8......................................Methods and gear. Catching of fish
346-351.........................................Fishery for individual species
360-363.........................................Seal fisheries. Fur sealing
364................................................Sea otter
365-380.92....................................Shellfish fisheries. Shellfish culture
381-385.........................................Whaling
387................................................Porpoises. Dolphins
388.7-391.5...................................Algae culture
393................................................Seagrasses
396................................................Sponge fisheries
400-400.8................................Seafood gathering
401-691...................................Angling. Including tackle, casting, methods of angling, angling for special kinds of fish

SK - Hunting sports 

37-39.5....................................Shooting
40-268.....................................By country
281-293...................................Special methods and types of hunting. Including bolos, game calling, tracking, trapping, dressing
284-287.........................................Fox hunting
291-292.........................................Coursing
293................................................Ferreting
295-305...................................Big game
311-335...................................Bird hunting. Fowling
336..........................................Varmint hunting (General)
337..........................................Predator hunting
341..........................................Other game
351-579...................................Wildlife management. Game protection. Including annual reports of game commissioners
590-593...................................Wild animal trade
650-664...................................Wildlife-related recreation

References

Further reading 
 Full schedule of all LCC Classifications
 List of all LCC Classification Outlines

S